The Northern Illinois University shooting was a school shooting that took place on Thursday, February 14, 2008, at Northern Illinois University in DeKalb, Illinois. Steven Kazmierczak opened fire with a shotgun and three pistols in a crowd of students on campus, killing five students and injuring 17 more people, before fatally shooting himself.

The shooting happened at the campus's Cole Hall at approximately 3:05 p.m. Central Standard Time. The school placed the campus on lockdown; students and teachers were advised to head to a secure location, take cover, and avoid the scene and all buildings in the vicinity of the area.

After the shooting, the university administration cancelled classes for the rest of the week as well as the following week.

Shooting

At approximately 3:05 p.m. CST, Steven Kazmierczak entered a large auditorium-style lecture hall in Cole Hall (Auditorium 101), where an oceanography class was in session with approximately 120 students present. Kazmierczak was wearing dark brown boots with laces; jeans; a black T-shirt with the word "Terrorist" imposed over an image of an assault rifle; a coat; a black knit hat; and a black utility belt with two magazine holsters, a holster for a handgun, three handguns (a 9×19mm Glock 19, a .380 ACP SIG Sauer P232, and a .380 ACP Hi-Point CF380), eight loaded magazines, and a knife. He also carried in a 12 gauge Remington Sportsman 48 shotgun concealed in a guitar case. He opened the auditorium door with such extreme force that many witnesses described him as "kicking the door in", entering at the extreme southwest corner, near the stage in front of the classroom,  and began firing at the students.

He next shot at the instructor, who was standing on the east side of the stage. The instructor tried to run out the exit at the southeast corner, but that door was locked. The instructor then ran out through the main exit at the east end of the classroom, through which the students were trying to leave. Some students who were not able to immediately escape hid under or in between the seats. When Kazmierczak paused to reload after firing three rounds, some students shouted "He's reloading" and began to escape. Others continued to hide or were too shocked to react. One of the victims, student Maria Christiansen, was critically struck in the face and neck. Christiansen would survive and later become an officer in the NIU Police Department. 

After shooting all six shotgun rounds, Kazmierczak fired on the room's remaining occupants with the 9mm Glock pistol, firing a total of approximately 50 rounds. He was reported to have walked up and down the west aisle and directly in front of or on the stage, firing at people as he went. He shot and killed himself before police reached the room. The police recovered 55 un-expended rounds of ammunition from the scene, including two fully loaded magazines containing rounds for a .380 semi-automatic pistol.

A total of 23 people were shot, six of whom died (including the perpetrator, who shot himself before police arrived). One witness reported that the gunman shot at least 30 rounds; police later collected 48 cartridge cases and 6 shotgun shells.

At the time of the shootings, Kazmierczak was a graduate student in the school of social work at the University of Illinois at Urbana-Champaign. He was a former NIU Sociology graduate student. NIU Police Chief Donald Grady described him as "an outstanding student" who reportedly had stopped taking psychiatric medication recently and became "somewhat erratic".

Emergency response
The first 9-1-1 call of an active shooter was reported at 3:06 p.m. Seven seconds later, NIU police officers were notified by the dispatcher. At 3:06:33 p.m., NIU police officers Ayala and Zimberoff responded and told dispatchers that they were in the area. Driving northbound on Normal Road near Swen Parson Hall, they encountered students running east from the Martin Luther King Commons area.  One student shouted, "He's shooting over there", pointing west towards the MLK Commons area. Officer Hodder was also driving in the area and encountered the same frenzy.

The officers proceeded in their vehicles, then on foot, joining Chief Grady, Lieutenant Mitchell, and Lieutenant Henert, who had reached the west side of the Commons area after coming directly from the Police Station.  Also racing to Cole Hall from the Police Station were Sergeant Ellington and Officer Wright. Sergeant Holland was on patrol just south of the area along Lincoln Highway when he heard the call come in, and approached the area.  In the MLK Commons, Chief Grady advised the officers to immediately begin attending to victims and identify witnesses and direct them to a room in Holmes Student Center, where they could be interviewed. Some of the officers began attending to injured students who were running from the scene.

While Henert established perimeters around Cole Hall, Mitchell and Grady entered the building, where they met with Holland, Ellington, and Wright.  Ellington, the first officer to arrive on the scene, evacuated the adjacent auditorium, and met with the other officers in the front walkway.  Holland was instructed to remain in the hallway to ensure no one came into the auditorium and that the shooter did not come out. Grady, Mitchell, Ellington, and Wright entered the south auditorium, discovering a body on the stage, surrounded by guns, with a pool of blood coming from the head. Victims with varying injuries lay on the floor or were propped up against the seats. Confirming there were no immediate threats, Grady and Mitchell began attending to victims, while Ellington and Wright confirmed that the shooter was dead.  At 3:11:42 (five minutes after the first 911 call), Ellington reported to the dispatcher, "Shooter's down. Shotgun's secure.  We need an ambulance and the coroner at Cole Hall."

At the same time that officers arrived at Cole Hall, Sergeant Rodman, who had left a meeting at the Holmes Student Center, arrived at the west entrance of that building to find a shooting victim who had been shot in the back and the head, along with another victim who had blood on the face, seeking help for his injured friend. Rodman attended to the most severely wounded victim.

By 3:11 p.m., a DeKalb Fire Department ambulance was the first to arrive on the scene and was staged in a nearby parking lot. The parking lots near the Field House were used as a staging area for ambulances and fire trucks that arrived from throughout the region. At 3:13 p.m., Sergeant Ellington advised that there were at least two deaths. Officers encountered several problems, including a piercing fire alarm that had been pulled, as well as very high radio traffic and static that made it hard to hear radio calls come in. In addition, due to conflicting reports (including the presence of a shooter at Founders Memorial Library) and the multitude of injured victims at various buildings around campus, officers needed to check multiple sites to rule out the possibility of multiple shooters and multiple shooting sites.  Injured victims began appearing at Neptune Hall (just north of Cole Hall) and at DuSable Hall (west of Cole). At 3:21 p.m., as personnel arrived from the DeKalb Fire Department, DeKalb County Sheriff's Office, DeKalb Police Department, and Sycamore Police Department, officers advised that the scene and perimeter of Cole Hall were secure, and that it was safe for emergency personnel to proceed to the shooting site and to the sites of the injured victims.

At 3:34 p.m., after a sweep of Founders Library was conducted and officers determined that Neptune and DuSable were not shooting sites, they declared the area safe. Police officers established a reception area for law enforcement personnel at Wirtz Hall, and an investigative command center at Holmes Student Center. By 4:00 p.m. CST, school officials announced that there was no further danger. They said that counselors would be made available in all residence halls.

Victims

Dead

Six people, all residents of Illinois, were killed by Kazmierczak:

Catalina Garcia, Juliana Gehant, Ryanne Mace, and shooter Steven Kazmierczak were declared dead on the scene at Cole Hall, while Daniel Parmenter was pronounced dead shortly after arrival to Kishwaukee Hospital at 4:00 p.m. Gayle Dubowski was flown to the nearest trauma center, St. Anthony Hospital in Rockford, where she was pronounced dead shortly after arrival at 4:14 p.m.

Injured
Twenty-one people survived the incident with injuries. Seventeen sustained gunshot wounds, while three injured their knees or backs escaping the scene; one injury was undetermined. Of them, three remained in Cole Hall, five had fled to Neptune Hall or its parking lots, one to DuSable Hall, two to the Holmes Student Center Bookstore, two to the Holmes Student Center's Sandburg Auditorium, three to the Health Services Building, and five returned home to seek treatment.

Sixteen of the injured victims were transported to DeKalb's Kishwaukee Community Hospital. One was transferred by helicopter to Rockford's Saint Anthony Medical Center, three to Downers Grove's Good Samaritan Hospital, and one to Rockford Memorial Hospital.

On February 15, another victim sought treatment at Kishwaukee Hospital, bringing the total of hospitalized injured victims to 17.  On February 15, seven of the victims were in critical condition, one in good condition, one in stable, and eight discharged, according to Kishwaukee Community Hospital.

Like those killed, all who were injured were from Illinois.

Perpetrator

Steven Phillip Kazmierczak (August 26, 1980 – February 14, 2008) was born in Elk Grove Village, Illinois. He was a student at the University of Illinois at the time of the shooting and was a former student at Northern Illinois University.

Personal life
Kazmierczak graduated from Elk Grove High School in 1998, during which he was treated temporarily for mental illness at the Elk Grove Village Thresholds-Mary Hill House psychiatric center, for being "unruly" at home, according to his parents Gail and Robert Kazmierczak. He was diagnosed with schizoaffective disorder as a teenager. He later went on to study sociology at Northern Illinois University (NIU). Though his family moved to Florida in 2004, Kazmierczak continued his education in Illinois. He enlisted in the United States Army in September 2001, and was discharged before completing basic training in February 2002 for lying on his application about his mental illness. His mother died in Lakeland, Florida in September 2006 from amyotrophic lateral sclerosis (also known as Lou Gehrig’s disease or ALS). At the time of Steven's death, his father was living in a retirement community in Lakeland.

Education
Kazmierczak graduated from NIU in 2006 where he received the Dean's award in 2006 and was considered a stand-out, well-regarded student. Campus police describe him as a "fairly normal" and an "unstressed person." Faculty, students, and staff "revered" him, and there was no indication of any trouble. NIU President John G. Peters said that he had "a very good academic record, no record of trouble." Kazmierczak was Vice-President of the NIU chapter of the American Correctional Association; he had also written about the U.S. correctional system, specifically prisons.

In 2006, Kazmierczak, along with two other graduate students and under the lead authorship of a sociology professor, co-authored an academic paper entitled, "Self-injury in Correctional Settings: 'Pathology' of Prisons or of Prisoners?"; it was published in the academic journal Criminology & Public Policy.

He was enrolled at NIU in the spring of 2007, where he took two courses in Arabic and a course called Politics of the Middle East. He left to begin graduate work in the School of Social Work at the University of Illinois, where he intended to study mental health issues. He was enrolled part-time at the University of Illinois during the fall of 2007 and worked from September 24 through October 10 at the Rockville Correctional Facility for Women near the Illinois–Indiana border. His reasons for leaving were unclear; he simply, "did not come back to work," according to Doug Garrison of the Indiana Department of Correction. By early 2008, at the time of the shooting, he was again enrolled full-time at the University of Illinois.

Possible motives
Kazmierczak died of a self-inflicted gunshot wound after the shooting ended. ABC News reports that his behavior seemed to become more erratic in the weeks leading up to the shooting, and that it is believed he stopped taking medication beforehand. His girlfriend confirmed that Kazmierczak was taking Xanax (anti-anxiety), Ambien (sleep aid), and Prozac (antidepressant), all of which were prescribed to him by a psychiatrist. She said that he stopped taking Prozac about three weeks prior to the February 14 shooting. She also said that, during their two-year relationship, she had never seen him display violent tendencies and she expressed bewilderment over the cause of the rampage. "He was anything but a monster," she said. "He was probably the nicest, most caring person ever." She also confirmed that Kazmierczak had called her early on Valentine's Day to say goodbye. She said that Kazmierczak called her at midnight and told her not to forget about him. After the shooting, authorities intercepted a number of packages he sent to her, which included such items as a gun holster and ammunition, a textbook on serial killers for her class, the book The Antichrist by Friedrich Nietzsche, and a final note written for her, signed with his given name and family name.

The shooting was baffling to those who knew him, as he appeared outgoing and never appeared to have social problems. Investigators were also puzzled by their failure to find a suicide note. Some of Kazmierczak's former NIU roommates described him as a quiet man who usually stayed to himself. They stated that, while fairly normal, they did not see him spend much time with other students.

However, a story published by Esquire confirmed his history of mental illness and alleged that he had attempted suicide, was bullied in high school and had shown an interest in previous school shootings, particularly those that occurred at Columbine High School and Virginia Tech. According to a report published by the United States Fire Administration, Kazmierczak is believed to have studied Virginia Tech perpetrator Seung-Hui Cho's actions and used a similar modus operandi.

Kazmierczak described himself as a sensitive person in his personal statement for the University of Illinois graduate school. He also felt victimized during his adolescent years. He expressed interest in helping people with mental problems, and wanted to work with people "in need of direction."

Reaction

The university's official website reported the possibility of a gunman on campus at 3:20 p.m., within 20 minutes of the shooting. The website then warned students, "There has been a report of a possible gunman on campus. Get to a safe area and take precautions until given the all clear. Avoid the King Commons and all buildings in that vicinity." By 3:40 p.m., all NIU classes were canceled for the remainder of the day and the campus was closed by NIU officials as part of a new security plan devised after the Virginia Tech shootings 10 months earlier. Students were asked to contact their parents as soon as possible.

All NIU Huskie sporting events, home and away, through Sunday were canceled. Most students left campus for the weekend. A spokesman for the ATF stated that agents were dispatched to the scene to assist and to help trace the weapons used. The FBI also sent agents to assist. According to police, Steven Kazmierczak removed the hard drive from his laptop computer and a computer chip from his cell phone and did not leave a note that could help explain why he chose a geology class on Valentine's Day to open fire. Investigators were expected to spend at least three more weeks until releasing a report on the incident.

Vigils and memorial services 

Approximately 2,000 gathered on campus on the evening of Friday, February 15, for a candlelight vigil to commemorate the victims; among other public figures, Jesse Jackson and Robert W. Pritchard spoke. In the days after the shooting, the Lutheran Campus Ministry held nightly candlelight vigils. All classes and athletic events were canceled through February 24, 2008. Faculty and staff returned to work on Tuesday, February 19, and for the remainder of that week received special information and training to help students upon their return to classes the following week.

On February 21, exactly a week after the shooting happened, five minutes of silence were observed from 3:06–3:11 p.m. CST, accompanied by the tolling of bells throughout the community, at a special ceremony attended by thousands in memory of the victims which was held at the MLK Commons. Moments of silence were also held elsewhere throughout the DeKalb community. There was a special memorial service held in the NIU Convocation Center on February 24, the day before classes resumed, in honor of the victims that initiated a set of activities and services aimed at community recovery. Due to the loss of one week of instructional time in the middle of the semester, an extra week was added in May.

Condolences and tributes 

United States President George W. Bush, Illinois Governor Rod Blagojevich, U.S. Senators Barack Obama and Dick Durbin, and U.S. Congressman Donald Manzullo offered their personal condolences to NIU President John Peters and the University community in wake of the tragedy, as did many local communities and school districts, and a plethora of universities across the United States.

The Chicago Blackhawks NHL franchise wore NIU Huskies decals on their helmets during their game on Sunday, February 17, 2008, versus the Colorado Avalanche. A moment of silence was also observed before the national anthem at the game, and the team wore the same decal during its next two games at the St. Louis Blues and at home against the Minnesota Wild. The Chicago Wolves of the AHL held an NIU night during which there was a moment of silence and NIU students were given the opportunity to participate during in game promotions. The Rockford Icehogs, also of the AHL, wore their red jerseys on the following Friday and Saturday night during the team's two home games at the Rockford MetroCentre, distributed red and black ribbons, had a 5 ft by 16 ft (1.5 m x 5 m) sign for people to sign, as well as encouraged fans to wear red to the game.

During spring training, Chicago White Sox manager Ozzie Guillén and general manager Ken Williams sported NIU caps in tribute to the victims. For their 2008 season, the Chicago Cubs flew an NIU flag over the grandstands in the out field. Virginia Tech had a tribute with students wearing shirts saying "Hokies for Huskies". Students wore these shirts during their basketball game against Georgia Tech on February 23, 2008.

Jon Bon Jovi offered his condolences in a Billboard magazine article, after his band Bon Jovi was forced to cancel rehearsals slated to begin on February 14, 2008, at the NIU Convocation Center in preparation for the North American leg of the Lost Highway Tour. The Chicago-based Jam/Prog Rock band Umphrey's McGee played a benefit show at the Egyptian Theater on April 8, 2008, for the NIU Memorial Fund. The incident was also immortalized as the subject of a David Bowie song called 'Valentine's Day' on the long-awaited comeback album of 2013, 'The Next Day'.

Cole Hall renovation
After February 14, 2008, Cole Hall was closed to the public.  Classes that were held in the building's two large auditoriums were relocated.
On February 25, 2008, then-governor Rod Blagojevich and university president John G. Peters proposed the demolition of the current Cole Hall. The proposal came as a response to the traumatic memories of the students who have to attend classes in the building. The proposal would tear down Cole Hall, leave the Cole Hall site as a memorial site, and erect a new building called "Memorial Hall" nearby, at a cost of approximately $40 million.

However, due to mixed emotions on the decision, President Peters sent out a message to all NIU students via their student email accounts, soliciting comments from students and the extended NIU family. In addition, a committee was established to help reach a consensus on the future of Cole Hall.

On May 8, 2008, it was announced that Cole Hall would be remodeled inside and out pending $7.7 million in state funding. This decision was made based on conversations between Dr. Peters and members of the campus community as well as the results of an online survey taken by students and faculty.

On August 27, 2009, the NIU Board of Trustees approved a $9.5 million budget on the Cole Hall renovation project, approximately $8 million of which will come from the aforementioned state funding, and the rest from student fees. The East auditorium, which was the scene of the incident, will no longer be used for classes, and a replacement lecture hall will be built elsewhere on campus. On January 27, 2010, Illinois Governor Pat Quinn came to the NIU campus to release the funds for the renovation of Cole Hall.

On January 14, 2011, the reconstruction at Cole Hall officially commenced.  The building re-opened on January 17, 2012. Cole Hall now houses the Anthropology Museum, which was housed in the Stevens Building previously.

Memorial garden and sculpture

On October 2, 2009, a metal sculpture designed by artist Bruce Niemi entitled Remembered was unveiled at Northern Illinois University. The sculpture is part of a garden built in remembrance of the victims of the NIU shooting, located directly across from Cole Hall. The memorial area also features five red granite walls erected in a half-circle pattern which read "Forward Together Forward Together Forward." The phrase "Forward Together Forward", borrowed from the university's fight song, became a motto and theme used in the healing of the NIU community after the shooting. Each wall features the name of one of the students who died in the shooting. A walking path with benches is also included. The memorial is flanked by trees and shrubbery. The memorial was funded entirely by private donations.

Graffiti warning
The campus was shut down on December 10, 2007, the first day during exam week, after graffiti was found on a restroom wall warning of a possible shooting. A university spokesman said that the warning, which was discovered December 10, made reference to the Virginia Tech massacre, in which 33 people were killed, but it could not be immediately determined whether the threat was related to the shootings on February 14, 2008. The Chicago Sun-Times reported at that time that an unknown person posted the graffiti in the Grant Towers D residence hall, which included a racial slur and the notation "What time? The VA tech shooters messed up w/ having only one shooter." However, NIU President John Peters stated that he did not believe that the December incident is connected to the February 14 shootings.

See also

 List of school-related attacks
 Virginia Tech shooting
 Charles Whitman, perpetrator of the University of Texas tower shooting
 Lane Bryant shooting, another Illinois mass shooting in February 2008
 Murder of Larry King, another school shooting that occurred on the same day
 Stoneman Douglas High School shooting, another school shooting that occurred exactly 10 years later
 Saint Valentine's Day Massacre, another Illinois mass shooting on Valentine's Day

Notes

References

External links
 Northern Star, NIU's campus newspaper with ongoing coverage of shooting
 
 Northwest Herald's "Tragedy on Campus", with a repository for stories, video, audio, timeline, and photographs in the aftermath of the Northern Illinois University (NIU) shootings
 ''Daily Chronicle'''s "Campus Loss", with a repository for stories, video, audio, timeline, and photographs in the aftermath of the Northern Illinois University (NIU) shootings
 NIU Remembers, NIU students, friends, family and the public mourn on this dedicated forum

University and college shootings in the United States
Shooting
2008 murders in the United States
21st-century mass murder in the United States
Murder–suicides in Illinois
Deaths by firearm in Illinois
Murder in Illinois
Mass murder in 2008
2008 in Illinois
School massacres in the United States
2008 mass shootings in the United States
Mass shootings in the United States
Crimes in Illinois
Attacks in the United States in 2008
February 2008 crimes
February 2008 events in the United States
Mass shootings in Illinois